South Korea competed at the 2005 Asian Indoor Games held in Bangkok, Thailand from November 12, 2005 to November 19, 2005. South Korea finished with 5 gold medals, 7 silver medals, and 10 bronze medals.

Medal summary

Medal table

Medalists

Asian Indoor Games
Korea, South
2005